Advance was an English-language weekly newspaper published in Sudan in the 1960s. The newspaper was linked to the Sudanese Communist Party. It was edited by Joseph Garang.

References

Defunct newspapers published in Sudan
English-language communist newspapers